Raczyński or Raczynski is a surname. Notable people with the surname include:

Aleksander Raczyński (1822–1889), Polish portrait painter
Bogdan Raczynski, Canada-based braindance artist
Edward Aleksander Raczyński (1847–1926), Polish nobleman, patron of arts
Edward Bernard Raczyński (1891–1993), Polish aristocrat, diplomat, writer, politician and President of Poland in exile (1979–1986)
Edward Raczyński (1786–1845) (1786–1845), Polish conservative politician, protector of arts, founder of the Raczyński Library in Poznań
Nicole Raczynski (born 1980), American professional wrestler
Zdzislaw Raczyński (born 1959), Polish diplomat, novelist and journalist
Raczyński Library in Poznań, founded by Edward Raczyński (1786–1845), in Poznań